2-Benzylpiperidine is a stimulant drug of the piperidine class. It is similar in structure to other drugs such as methylphenidate and desoxypipradrol but around one twentieth as potent, and while it boosts norepinephrine levels to around the same extent as d-amphetamine, it has very little effect on dopamine levels, with its binding affinity for the dopamine transporter around 175 times lower than for the noradrenaline transporter. 2-benzylpiperidine is little used as a stimulant, with its main use being as a synthetic intermediate in the manufacture of other drugs.

See also 
 4-Benzylpiperidine
 Benzylpiperazine

References 

Stimulants
 
2-Piperidinyl compounds